RCF may refer to:

Science and technology
 Refractory ceramic fibre, an aluminium silicate wool insulation, see High temperature insulation wool
 Rey-Osterrieth Complex Figure or Rey complex figure, a neuropsychological test
 Radio Communication Failure, a transponder code (see NORDO)
 Relative centrifugal force, the acceleration in a centrifuge normalized to Earth's gravity
 A Lexus RC F

Mathematics
 Rational canonical form in abstract algebra
 Real closed field in mathematics
 Row canonical form in linear algebra

Companies
 Rail Coach Factory, Kapurthala, India
 Rashtriya Chemicals & Fertilizers, Mumbai, India
 RCF audio, an Italian pro audio manufacturer

Other
 Ratchet & Clank Future: Tools of Destruction, a video game
 Revolving credit facility
 Racing Club de France, an omnisport club in Paris 
 Russian Curling Federation, a member of the World Curling Federation